Nitratireductor lacus is a Gram-negative bacteria from the genus of Nitratireductor which has been isolated from the Yuncheng Salt Lake in China.

References

External links
Type strain of Nitratireductor lacus at BacDive -  the Bacterial Diversity Metadatabase

Phyllobacteriaceae
Bacteria described in 2016